Cawthorne is a civil parish in the metropolitan borough of Barnsley, South Yorkshire, England.  The parish contains 80 listed buildings that are recorded in the National Heritage List for England.  Of these, three are listed at Grade II*, the middle of the three grades, and the others are at Grade II, the lowest grade.  The parish contains the village of Cawthorne and the surrounding countryside.  In the parish is the country house of Cannon Hall, and its grounds, Cannon Hall Park.  The hall is listed, together with associated buildings and structures in the park.  Most of the other listed buildings are houses, cottages, and associated structures, farmhouses and farm buildings.  The other listed buildings include a church and items in the churchyard, particularly grave slabs, bridges, a former corn mill, a former toll house, a guide post and milestones, drinking fountains, sculpted panels in a wall, a well, and a telephone kiosk.


Key

Buildings

References

Citations

Sources

 

Lists of listed buildings in South Yorkshire
Buildings and structures in the Metropolitan Borough of Barnsley